Hlínoviště is a village and part of Bělá pod Bezdězem in Mladá Boleslav District in the Central Bohemian Region of the Czech Republic. It has about 200 inhabitants. It is located in the western part of the town's territory.

References

Neighbourhoods in the Czech Republic
Populated places in Mladá Boleslav District